Soto en Cameros is a village in the province and autonomous community of La Rioja, Spain. The city has an elevation of 2,510 feet.

But Soto en Cameros truly stands out in culinary matters thanks to the marzipans, created using only almonds and sugar.

Notable people 
 Claudio Antón de Luzuriaga, was a Spanish lawyer and politician who served as Minister of State in 1854, in a cabinet headed by Baldomero Espartero, 1st Duke of la Victoria.

References

External links 

 Soto en Cameros: Página personal sobre la localidad

Populated places in La Rioja (Spain)